Jiaping (嘉平) may refer to:

Jiaping Town, a town in Jiangjin District, Chongqing, China

Historical eras
Jiaping (249–254), era name used by Cao Fang, emperor of Cao Wei
Jiaping (311–315), era name used by Liu Cong (Han Zhao), emperor of Han Zhao
Jiaping (408–414), era name used by Tufa Rutan, ruler of Southern Liang